The following lists events that happened during 1849 in Chile.

Incumbents
President of Chile: Manuel Bulnes

Events

July
6 July - The University of Santiago, Chile is established.

Births
29 June - Pedro Montt (died 1910)

Deaths
13 January - Francisco Ramón Vicuña (born 1775)

References 

 
1840s in Chile
Chile
Chile